Lonely Hearts Club may refer to:

Film and broadcasting
Lonely Hearts Club (Chinese: 怨婦俱樂部; pinyin: Yuàn fù jùlèbù), section of the film In Between
The Lonely Hearts Club, a weekly radio-comedy program with Tony Martin

Music
Lonely Hearts Club, a 2015 album by Marco Restrepo
Lonely Hearts Club, a 1978 album from Billie Jo Spears discography, or the title track
"Lonely Hearts Club", a 2020 song by Winona Oak
"Lonely Hearts Club", song by Marina from Electra Heart

Other
Lonely Hearts Club, an earlier fashion label from the creators of Lonely

See also
Lonely Hearts (disambiguation)
Sgt. Pepper's Lonely Hearts Club Band, a 1967 album by the English rock band the Beatles